The 2016–17 CSA Provincial One-Day Challenge was a List A cricket competition that took place in South Africa from 9 October 2016 to 2 April 2017. The competition was played between the thirteen South African provincial teams and Namibia. The tournament was played in parallel with the 2016–17 Sunfoil 3-Day Cup, a first-class competition which featured the same teams.

Northerns finished top of Pool A and Namibia finished top of Pool B, with both teams progressing to the final of the competition. It was the first time that Namibia had reached the final of the One-Day Challenge. In the final, Northerns won the match, beating Namibia by 7 wickets.

Points table 

Pool A

 Team qualified for the final

Pool B

 Team qualified for the final

Group stage

Pool A

Pool B

Cross Pool

Final

References

External links 
 Series home at ESPN Cricinfo

South African domestic cricket competitions
CSA Provincial One-Day Challenge
2016–17 South African cricket season